Alfrēds Plade (11 June 1905 – 29 March 1944) was a Latvian footballer who played as a midfielder. He made one appearance for the Latvia national team in 1923 and was part of the squad at the 1924 Summer Olympics.

Personal life and death
Plade was born in Riga, son of cantor Jekabs Plade and his wife Sofija Rozalija (nee Veikmane). He was one of four brothers who represented Latvia in football, the others were Voldemars, Kurts and Teodors. He did compulsory military service in a Latvian Army tank regiment in 1925-26 and worked as a cantor.

In 1939, unlike his brothers he did not repatriate to Germany as a Baltic German and remained a Latvian national. During the German occupation of Latvia in World War II he joined the Latvian Auxiliary Police and was killed in action on the Russian Front in March 1944.

References

External links
 

1905 births
1944 deaths
Footballers from Riga
Latvian footballers
Association football midfielders
Latvia international footballers
Latvian collaborators with Nazi Germany
Footballers at the 1924 Summer Olympics
Olympic footballers of Latvia
Latvian military personnel killed in World War II